Sky crane may refer to:
 A type of aerial crane helicopter pioneered by Sikorsky in 1950s and 1960s where the fuselage is only large enough to accommodate the pilot and crew and does not have a cargo hold or passenger area. Examples include S-64 Skycrane, S-60 and CH-54 Tarhe.
 Sikorsky S-64 Skycrane, an American twin-engine heavy-lift helicopter
 Soft landing systems used by Mars rovers:
 Mars Science Laboratory#Sky crane used for the Curiosity rover
 Mars 2020#Entry, descent, and landing (EDL) used for the Perseverance rover

See also 
 Aerial crane